The 2014 Bristol City Council election took place on 22 May 2014 to elect members of Bristol City Council in England, as part of the United Kingdom 2014 Local Elections.

214,544 people were eligible to vote in the elections, of which 58,907 turned out to do so. Consequently, overall turnout was 27.5%.

Ward results

Avonmouth

Bedminster

Bishopston

Bishopsworth

Brislington East

Brislington West

Filwood

Harcliffe

Henbury

Hengrove

Henleaze

Horfield

Kingsweston

Knowle

Lockleaze

Redland

Southmead

Southville

St George West

Stockwood

Stoke Bishop

Westbury-on-Trym

Whitchurch Park

Windmill Hill

References

External links
Full list of Bristol City Council Elections 2014

2014 English local elections
2014
2010s in Bristol